The episodes of Peacemaker Kurogane anime series are based on the manga written by Nanae Chrono. The anime series was made by Gonzo Digimation. Its 24 episodes were broadcast on TV Asahi between October 7, 2003 and March 24, 2004.

The US license for the anime is held by ADV Films under the title Peacemaker. The anime follows the plot of the manga mostly, but also introduces characters that are only shown in the sequel of the story. The anime aired in the United States on Showtime Beyond, alongside Chrono Crusade. The anime was broadcast in France by Déclic-Images. It was broadcast in Spain by Buzz Channel. It was broadcast in Saudi Arabia by space power, in the Philippines by QTV and Hero

The anime uses two pieces of theme music. The opening theme is "You Gonna Feel" by Hav while the ending theme is "Hey Jimmy!" by Hav.

Gonzo Digimation released the anime's seven DVDs between December 21, 2003 and June 25, 2004. Gonzo Digimation released the DVD box set, containing all 7 DVDs, on December 22, 2004. ADV Films released the anime's seven DVDs between September 14, 2004 and September 13, 2005. ADV Films released the DVD box set, containing all 7 DVDs, on November 15, 2005.


Episode list

DVD releases

Region 1 (North America)

References

Peacemaker Kurogane